Peake was an electoral district of the House of Assembly in the Australian state of South Australia from 1970 to 2002. The district was based in the western suburbs of Adelaide.

Typically a Labor seat, it was lost to the Liberal Party at the landslide 1993 state election. Peake was superseded by West Torrens at the 2002 state election.

Members for Peake

Election results

External links
1985 & 1989 election boundaries, page 18 & 19

Former electoral districts of South Australia
1970 establishments in Australia
2002 disestablishments in Australia